Mrinal Miri (born 1 August 1940) is an Indian philosopher and educationalist.

Early life
He was awarded a BA in Philosophy from the University of Cambridge in 1966 and gained his doctorate in 1970.

Career
From 1970 to 1974 he was a Lecturer in Philosophy at St. Stephen's College under the University of Delhi, before moving to North Eastern Hill University. Mrinal also served as the Director of the Indian Institute of Advanced Study, Shimla, from 1993 to 1999. He was nominated as a member of Rajya Sabha on 21 March 2012.

He has been awarded a Padma Bhushan for his contribution in the field of education and literature. He was a member of the National Advisory Council established by the Manmohan Singh UPA I government. He is a member of the council set up for the implementation of RTE act also called as NAC.

Personal life
He is married to Sujata Miri, a fellow philosopher.

Publications
 The Place of Humanities in Our Universities (ed), Routledge, 2018
 The Idea of Surplus: Tagore and Contemporary Human Sciences (ed), Routledge, New Delhi, 2016
 Philosophy and Education, Oxford University Press, 2014
Identity and the Moral life, Oxford University Press, 2002 
Tribal India: Continuity and Change (Ed), Indian Institute of Advanced Study, Shimla, 1993
Five Essays on Kant (Ed), North Eastern Hill University, 1987
Philosophy of Psychoanalysis, Indian Institute of Advanced Study, Shimla, 1997.

References

External links
Profile at the NAC website
Biography of Prof Mtinai Miri

20th-century Indian educational theorists
Recipients of the Padma Bhushan in literature & education
1940 births
Living people
Academic staff of the North-Eastern Hill University
Members of National Advisory Council, India
Academic staff of Delhi University
Scholars from Assam
Nominated members of the Rajya Sabha
Rajya Sabha members from Arunachal Pradesh
20th-century Indian philosophers